Ursula Werner (born 28 September 1943) is a German actress.

Biography
Born in Eberswalde, Werner grew up in the Prenzlauer Berg district of Berlin. After studying at the Staatliche Schauspielschule Berlin (Berlin State Drama College), she obtained her first roles in the Halle Opera House, and in the Berlin cabaret "Die Distel". 

From 1974 to 2009, Werner was a permanent member of the Maxim-Gorki-Theater in Berlin. She also made guest appearances on the Gorki stage. She is particularly remembered for her role of Dr. Unglaube in the 1977 film Ein irrer Duft von frischem Heu ("A Terrific Scent of Fresh Hay"). From 2001 to 2007, she played a permanent secondary character in the Schloss Einstein series. 

Following several minor roles in film and on TV, she took the leading role for Andreas Dresen's 2008 film Wolke 9 ("Cloud 9") where she played the part of a woman in her late sixties who leaves her older husband for an even older man. For this unusual role, Werner received the 2009 German Film Award (Lola) for the best female leading role.

Werner lives in Berlin. Her next film, Wintervater, where she plays the role of Lene, is in post-production and will be released in 2011.

Filmography

Films 

 1962: Wind von vorn
 1967: Frau Venus und ihr Teufel
 1969: Seine Hoheit: Genosse Prinz
 1970: Netzwerk
 1970: Fiete Stein
 1970: Weil ich dich liebe
 1973: Zement
 1974: Der nackte Mann auf dem Sportplatz
 1976: Die Trauerrede und andere heitere Begebenheiten
 1976: Ein altes Modell
 1977: Ein irrer Duft von frischem Heu
 1977: Unterwegs nach Atlantis
 1978: Ein Kolumbus auf der Havel
 1980: 
 1981: Bürgschaft für ein Jahr
 1983: 
 1984: Ich liebe Victor
 1984: Drei Schwestern
 1985: Meine Frau Inge und meine Frau Schmidt
 1985: Der verzauberte Weihnachtsmann
 1986: Die Herausforderung
 1987: Vater gesucht
 1987: Jan Oppen
 1987: Märchenzirkus
 1988: Stunde der Wahrheit
 1989: 
 1990: König Phantasios
 1991: Scheusal
 1991: Lord Hansi
 2000: 
 2002: Hundsköpfe
 2004: Saniyes Lust
 2004: Oegeln
 2004: Land's End
 2005: 
 2008: Narrenspiel
 2008: Cloud 9
 2008: Über Wasser gehen
 2009: Am anderen Ende
 2012: Two Lives

Television 
Her television credits include Schloss Einstein and Einzug ins Paradies.
1975: Broddi
1975–1989: Polizeiruf 110: Ein Fall ohne Zeugen
1978: Polizeiruf 110: Schuldig
1987: Einzug ins Paradies
1989: Polizeiruf 110: Drei Flaschen Tokajer
2001: Liebesau: Die andere Heimat
2001–2007: Schloss Einstein
2019: Hanna

Awards 
1989 Goethepreis der Stadt Berlin(Goethe Prize of the City-State of Berlin)
2008 Nominierungen für den Bambi 2008 als beste Schauspielerin International und Europäischen Filmpreis 2008 als Beste Darstellerin für Wolke Neun(Nominated for the Bambi Award as Best Female Performer-International and Best Actress at the European Film Awards for Cloud 9)
2008 Prix Tudor Best Female Performance in Geneva Cinéma Tout Ecran(Prix Tudor for Best Female Performance at the Geneva Cinéma Tout Ecran)
2008 "Coup de Coeur" at the Internationalen Filmfestspielen von Cannes.(Coup de Coeur at the Cannes Film Festival)
2008 Bayerischer Filmpreis as Beste Darstellerin für Wolke Neun(Best Actress at the Bavarian Film Festival for Cloud 9)
 2009: Deutscher Filmpreis 2009 as Beste Hauptdarstellerin für Wolke Neun.(Best Actress in a starring role for Cloud 9-German Film Awards 2009)

References

External links
Official website

Film festival Max Ophüls Preis
Franziska v. Mutius: "Berühmtsein ist auch eine Belastung" – Interview in Berliner Morgenpost, 28 May 2009, p. 28
Interview at the 2008 Cannes Film Festival at Arte Kultur
Ich bin ein fröhlicher Mensch - biography

1943 births
German film actresses
German television actresses
Living people
Ernst Busch Academy of Dramatic Arts alumni
Best Actress German Film Award winners
People from Eberswalde
Actresses from Berlin
20th-century German actresses
21st-century German actresses